Events from the year 1682 in France

Incumbents
 Monarch – Louis XIV

Events
Construction of the Canal de la Bruche started

Births
 
1 April – Pierre-Joseph Thoulier d'Olivet, abbot, writer, grammarian and translator (d. 1768)
27 April – Claudine Guérin de Tencin, salonist and author (d. 1749)
16 August – Louis, Duke of Burgundy, later Dauphin of France (d. 1712)

Full date missing 
Marie-Anne Horthemels, engraver (d. 1727)
Jean-Baptiste Francois des Marets, marquis de Maillebois, a Marshall of France (d. 1762)
Claude Du Bosc, engraver (d. 1745?)

Deaths
18 February – Pierre Dupuis, painter (b. 1610)
25 April – Ambroise Janvier, Benedictine and theologian (b. 1613)
28 May – Henri, Duke of Verneuil, bishop and diplomat (b. 1682)
24 August – Marie Charlotte de la Trémoille, noblewoman (b. 1632)

Full date missing 
Antoine Bouzonnet-Stella, painter and printmaker (b. 1634)
Raymond Restaurand, physician (b. 1627)

See also

References

1680s in France